Heidi Weng (born 20 July 1991) is a Norwegian cross-country skier and fell runner.

Career
In cross-country skiing her best individual World Cup finish is her victories in Tour de Ski both 2016–17 and 2017–18. She has won three gold medals at the Junior World Championships, two in relay and one in pursuit. She has won six medals at World Championships, four of them gold.

She is a Norwegian senior champion in fell running in 2010, and placed fourth at the World Junior Championships in the same year. She is also a Norwegian junior champion in cross-country running.

She hails from Ytre Enebakk, but represents the club IL i BUL.

Weng won the bronze medal at the skiathlon event at the 2014 Winter Olympics in Sochi.

Cross-country skiing results
All results are sourced from the International Ski Federation (FIS).

Olympic Games
 1 medal – (1 bronze)

World Championships
 9 medals – (5 gold, 3 silver, 1 bronze)

World Cup

Season titles
 4 titles – (2 overall, 2 distance)

Season standings

Individual podiums
 13 victories – (5 , 8 ) 
 105 podiums – (51 , 54 )

Team podiums
 12 victories – (12 ) 
 18 podiums – (17 , 1 )

References

External links
 
 
 
 

1991 births
Living people
People from Enebakk
Norwegian female cross-country skiers
Norwegian female long-distance runners
FIS Nordic World Ski Championships medalists in cross-country skiing
FIS Cross-Country World Cup champions
Cross-country skiers at the 2014 Winter Olympics
Cross-country skiers at the 2018 Winter Olympics
Olympic cross-country skiers of Norway
Olympic bronze medalists for Norway
Olympic medalists in cross-country skiing
Medalists at the 2014 Winter Olympics
Tour de Ski winners
Tour de Ski skiers
Sportspeople from Viken (county)